Cryptoconidae  is an extinct family of small to medium-sized sea snails, marine gastropod mollusks in the superfamily Conoidea.

Genera
  † Cryptoconus Koenen, 1867

References

 Cossmann, 1896: Essais de paleoconchology comparée, 2 Paris 179 pp. 8 pls.
 Bouchet P., Rocroi J.P., Hausdorf B., Kaim A., Kano Y., Nützel A., Parkhaev P., Schrödl M. & Strong E.E. (2017). Revised classification, nomenclator and typification of gastropod and monoplacophoran families. Malacologia. 61(1-2): 1-526

Conoidea